Edward Watson (27 October 1901 – 1986) was an English professional footballer who played as a full-back for Sunderland.

References

1901 births
1986 deaths
Footballers from Sunderland
English footballers
Association football fullbacks
Sunderland West End F.C. players
Sunderland A.F.C. players
Queens Park Rangers F.C. players
Rochdale A.F.C. players
Carlisle United F.C. players
English Football League players
Date of death missing